Visjon Norge (or TV Visjon Norge) is a Norwegian Christian television station, which was launched in 2003 as the first Scandinavian Christian television channel to air 24 hours a day. It can be reached throughout Scandinavia by satellite. The founder and executive editor of the channel is Jan Hanvold. A sister channel based in Sweden, TV Vision Norden was launched in 2015.

Organization
TV Visjon Norge has 75 employees, in addition to a number of volunteers. The television department of the organisation has 30 employees. 46% of the channel's programming is produced by its "broadcasting partners", and the remainder by the channel itself. Visjon Norge also does aid work in Eastern Europe and Africa, and has aired programs about its work in Moldova. In addition it operates two radio stations, and has a monthly magazine with 17,000 subscribers (2011). The organisation has its headquarters in Drammen.

History
Visjon Norge began broadcasting on March 24, 2003. It airs over Scandinavia 24 hours a day, with a variety of Christian-themed programming, aiming to preach the gospel of Jesus and to support the state of Israel. The company is owned by Visjonskirken, a local congregation founded by Jan Hanvold and his wife Inger in 2001, but the channel itself is officially interdenominational. The channel claimed 100,000 more or less regular viewers by 2007, in addition to Norway, mostly in Sweden and the Faroe Islands. It is available to 98% of Norwegian households, and averages around 20,000 daily viewers in Norway as of 2015 (TNS Gallup).

Visjon Norge has been cited as a central part in mobilizing the development of a new Christian right in Norway, and accused of promoting The Christians Party. Abroad, the channel has held meeting campaigns with thousands of people in the Faroe Islands.

TV Vision Norden
Due to a large viewership and more programming from Sweden, Visjon Norge attempted to branch out to the country with a television studio in Floda, Lerum in 2010. While the initial attempt to launch a stand-alone channel sizzled through, the sister channel TV Vision Norden was finally launched in 2015. The channel is based in Gothenburg.

Programming
In addition to its own programming, the channel broadcasts programs by various groups and people, including Forum Idag, Hanne Nabintu Herland, Oslo Symposium (biennial conference), ES TV, Dansk TV Mission, Open Doors, Hope Channel, and formerly included Hillsong, Youth of Europe and Livets Ord.

In 2014 Livets Ord was replaced with a slot for Ludvig Nessa and the "Church of Norway in Exile", following Jan Hanvold attacking Livets Ord leader Ulf Ekman as a "heretic" after Ekman converted to Roman Catholicism, and accusing Livets Ord of "sectarianism" and of operating as a "personality cult".

Controversies
In its early years TV Visjon Norge was funded by the aid foundation Visjon Norge Misjon, formerly Visjon Bibel Center (VBC) founded by Jan Hanvold in 1989, which has been criticized for using most of its donated aid money on television operations and purchasing property for TV Visjon Norge.

In 2006 the channel was reprimanded by the Norwegian Media Authority after a rerun of an evening show was aired in an early morning timeslot on NRK2 (which formerly had slots for independent programming), showing an explicit video of an abortion procedure. Jan Hanvold apologized and described the incident as a technical mistake.

In response to the criticism Jan Hanvold defended Oniwinde, noting some cultural differences and that the portion of the show had been taken out of context, while stating that Visjon Norge did not support any notion of direct payment for miracles or healing.

In February 2020, preacher Dionny Baez appeared on Visjon Norge telling viewers to donate 2020 kroner, saying it would protect the giver's children from the COVID-19 pandemic.

References

External links
 Official website
 Official web-TV

2003 establishments in Norway
Television channels in Norway
Christian mass media in Norway
Conservatism in Norway
History of Christianity in Norway